The Caproni Ca.142 was a three-engined multirole aircraft built by Caproni in the mid-1930s.

Design
The Ca.142 was a high-wing trimotor monoplane which differed from the Caproni Ca.133 in having a new landing gear with the retractable front elements to replace the fixed one of its predecessor. Flight results expressed by the Ca.142 failed to achieve the desired results, and the Ca.142 in September 1937 was handed over to the Regia Aeronautica, which allocated it the registration MM 327.

Specifications

See also

References

Ca.142
Trimotors
High-wing aircraft
Aircraft first flown in 1935